Tarek Berguiga (born September 11, 1985) is an Algerian football goalkeeper who plays for ES Sétif in the Algerian Ligue Professionnelle 1.

Club career
Berguiga made his debut for ES Sétif on April 14, 2012, as a starter in a league match against MC Oran.

Honours
 Won the Algerian Cup once with ES Sétif in 2012

References

External links
 
 

1985 births
Living people
Algerian footballers
Algerian Ligue Professionnelle 1 players
ES Sétif players
People from Touggourt
MC Mekhadma players
USM El Harrach players
Association football goalkeepers
21st-century Algerian people